Maryhill State Park is a public recreation area on the Columbia River in Klickitat County, Washington. The  state park offers  of shoreline and facilities for camping, hiking, boating, fishing, and swimming. The Maryhill Stonehenge, a full-scale concrete replica of Stonehenge, stands on a bluff not far from the park.

References

External links

Maryhill State Park Washington State Parks and Recreation Commission 
Maryhill State Park Map Washington State Parks and Recreation Commission

State parks of Washington (state)
Parks in Klickitat County, Washington